United Nations Security Council Resolution 269, adopted on August 12, 1969, condemned the government of South Africa for its refusal to comply with resolution 264, deciding that the continued occupation of South West Africa (now Namibia) was an aggressive encroachment on the authority of the United Nations. The resolution also called for South Africa to remove its administration of South West Africa before October 4, 1969, calling on all states to refrain from dealings with either country and noting it would consider a further meeting if the present resolution was not implemented to discuss further action the Council could take.

The resolution was adopted by 11 votes to none; Spain, France, the United Kingdom and United States abstained from voting.

See also
 List of United Nations Security Council Resolutions 201 to 300 (1965–1971)
 United Nations Commissioner for Namibia

References 
Text of the Resolution at undocs.org

External links
 

 0269
 0269
 0269
August 1969 events